Oubkiri Marc Yao is a Burkinabé politician and a member of the Pan-African Parliament from Burkina Faso. He is also First Vice-President of the National Assembly of Burkina Faso, and former Ambassador of Burkina Faso to the Soviet Union, Denmark, and Ghana.

See also
 List of members of the Pan-African Parliament

References

Members of the National Assembly of Burkina Faso
Members of the Pan-African Parliament from Burkina Faso
Living people
Year of birth missing (living people)
Ambassadors of Burkina Faso to the Soviet Union
Ambassadors of Burkina Faso to Denmark
Ambassadors of Burkina Faso to Ghana
21st-century Burkinabé people